Osvaldo Ferrari (born 30 September 1942) is an Italian wrestler. He competed in the men's freestyle 78 kg at the 1968 Summer Olympics.

References

External links
 

1942 births
Living people
Italian male sport wrestlers
Olympic wrestlers of Italy
Wrestlers at the 1968 Summer Olympics
Sportspeople from Genoa
World Wrestling Championships medalists